Dearica Marie Hamby (born November 6, 1993) is an American basketball player for the Los Angeles Sparks of the Women's National Basketball Association (WNBA).

College
During her senior year Hamby averaged 20.3 points, the highest scoring average in the Atlantic Coast Conference Women's  and 10.7 rebounds, the second highest in the conference. During her junior year she had one of the best single-seasons in school-history. In 31 games she led the nation's top conference in both scoring (22.0) and rebounding (11.0) She would become the first Demon Deacon to lead the ACC in both categories in the same season. She finished as Wake Forest's all-time leading scorer and rebounder, with 1,801 points and 1,021 rebounds.

Wake Forest statistics
Source

WNBA career
Drafted 6th overall in 2015, Hamby played for the San Antonio Stars which became the Las Vegas Aces. She shot an average of 11 points, 7.6 rebounds, 1.9 assists and 0.97 steals per game. She tied the WNBA record for the most double-doubles by a reserve off the bench with five.

Hamby was voted WNBA Sixth Woman of the Year in 2019, almost unanimously (41 of 43 votes).

On the same day she received her award, in the second round, single-elimination 2019 WNBA Playoffs game against the Chicago Sky, with 6.5 seconds remaining and her team behind 92–90, Hamby made what the WNBA website termed "the shot of the year." Hamby stole a pass from Courtney Vandersloot intended for Diamond DeShields, dribbled once past half court, and threw in the game-winning basket, securing an Aces win.

On September 20, 2020, Hamby was named Sixth Woman of the Year for the second year in a row.

Hamby signed a multi-year contract extension with the Aces on June 29, 2022.

She, and the Aces, won the 2022 WNBA Championship.

On January 21, 2023 Hamby was traded to the Los Angeles Sparks alongside a 2024 WNBA Draft 1st round pick in exchange for the rights of Amanda Zahui B. and a 2024 WNBA Draft 2nd round pick.

Personal life 
Hamby gave birth to her daughter, Amaya, in February of 2017. In September of 2022 at the Las Vegas Aces Championship parade Hamby announced she is expecting her second child, Legend.  Dearica Hamby announced the birth of her second child Legend Maree Scandrick on her Instagram account on March 15, 2023.

WNBA career statistics

Regular season

|-
| style="text-align:left;"| 2015
| style="text-align:left;"| San Antonio
| 31 || 16 || 17.4 || .354 || .353 || .642 || 4.1 || 0.7 ||	0.4 || 0.2 || 1.3 || 6.1
|-
| style="text-align:left;"| 2016
| style="text-align:left;"| San Antonio
| 25 || 25 || 25.3 || .422 || .143 || .723 || 5.1 || 1.0 || 0.5 || 0.5 || 1.6 || 9.0
|-
| style="text-align:left;"| 2017
| style="text-align:left;"| San Antonio
| 34 ||	3 || 20.2 || .457 || .375 || .608 || 4.2 || 1.0 || 0.9 || 0.3 || 1.4 || 7.8
|-
| style="text-align:left;"| 2018
| style="text-align:left;"| Las Vegas
| 33 || 0 || 14.4 || .526 || .289 || .742 || 3.6 || 1.2 || 0.7 || 0.3 || 1.1 || 7.4
|-
| style="text-align:left;"| 2019
| style="text-align:left;"| Las Vegas
| 34 || 9 || 24.8 || .488 || .321 || .718 || 7.6 || 1.9 || 1.0 || 0.4 || 1.8 || 11.0
|-
| style="text-align:left;"| 2020
| style="text-align:left;"| Las Vegas
| 22 || 0 || 28.3 || .539 || .474 || .716 || 7.1 || 2.7 || 1.7 || 0.2 || 2.0 || 13.0
|-
| style="text-align:left;"| 2021
| style="text-align:left;"| Las Vegas
| 23 ||	0 || 25.1 || .531 || .226 || .673 || 7.0 || 1.8 || 1.0 || 0.1 || 1.5 || 11.3
|-
|style="text-align:left;background:#afe6ba;"|  2022†
| style="text-align:left;"| Las Vegas
| 34 || 32 || 26.5 || .466 || .219 || .720 || 7.1 || 1.1 || 1.1 || 0.1 || 1.5 || 9.3
|-
| style='text-align:left;'| Career
| style='text-align:left;'| 8 years, 1 team
| 242 || 85 || 22.3 || .476 || .296 || .687 || 5.6 || 1.4 || 0.9 || 0.2 || 2.0 || 9.2
|}

Postseason

|-
| style="text-align:left;"| 2019
| style="text-align:left;"| Las Vegas
| 5 || 0 || 28.4 || .556 || .462 || .400 || 7.0 || 3.0 || 0.8 || 0.0 || 1.6 || 12.0
|-
| style="text-align:left;"| 2020
| style="text-align:left;"| Las Vegas
| 3 || 0 || 25.0 || .529 || .200 || .625 || 3.0 || 2.3 || 0.7 || 0.0 || 2.7 || 8.0
|-
| style="text-align:left;"| 2021
| style="text-align:left;"| Las Vegas
| 5 || 0 || 17.4 || .292 || .000 || .500 || 4.8 || 1.0 || 0.4 || 0.2 || 0.4 || 3.8
|-
|style="text-align:left;background:#afe6ba;"|  2022†
| style="text-align:left;"| Las Vegas
| 6 || 0 || 8.5 || .600 || .000 || .250 || 1.5 || 0.8 || 0.2 || 0.2 || 0.7 || 1.2
|-
| style='text-align:left;'| Career
| style='text-align:left;'| 4 years, 1 team
| 19 || 0 || 18.7 || .484 || .292 || .469 || 4.1 || 1.7 || 0.5 || 0.1 || 1.2 || 5.8
|}

References

External links

1993 births
Living people
American expatriate basketball people in Italy
American expatriate basketball people in South Korea
American women's basketball players
Basketball players from Marietta, Georgia
Forwards (basketball)
Las Vegas Aces players
San Antonio Stars draft picks
San Antonio Stars players
Wake Forest Demon Deacons women's basketball players
Women's National Basketball Association All-Stars